Jonson is a surname, and may refer to:

 Ben Jonson (1572–1637), English Renaissance dramatist, poet and actor
 Björn Jonson (born 1940), Swedish professor
 Fredric Jonson (born 1987), Swedish professional football player
 Gail Jonson (born 1965), former medley and butterfly swimmer
 Graeme Jonson (born 1940), Australian rules footballer
 Gustav Jonson (1880–1942), Estonian military soldier
 Halvar Jonson (1941–2016), Canadian politician
 Mattias Jonson (born 1974), Swedish professional football player
 Pål Jonson, (born 1972), Swedish politician
 Peter Jonson, English shoemaker
 Raymond Jonson (1891–1982), American painter

See also

 Johnson (disambiguation)

Patronymic surnames